Aziza Barnes is an American poet. Barnes frequently performs slam poetry and has performed at the Da Poetry Lounge, Urban Word NYC, PBS NewsHour and Nuyoricans Poets Cafe.

Education 
Barnes received their B.A from the New York University at the Tisch School of the Arts. They received their MFA from the University of Mississippi.

Career
Barnes is the author of the chapbook me Aunt Jemima and the nailgun (2013), which won an Exploding Pinecone Prize from Button Poetry. Their full-length collection, i be but i ain’t (2016), won a Pamet River Prize from YesYes Books. They are the cofounder of the Poetry Gods podcast and the co-founder of The Conversation Literary Festival. Barnes wrote the play BLKS that played at Steppenwolf Theatre Company in Chicago. Their upcoming collection, The Blind Pig will be released by Not A Cult media.

BLKS 
BLKS centers around the story of four black millennial friends, Octavia, June, Ry and Imani, who share a New York City apartment. The play has been determined a "comedic social realism" and is a "day in the life" style of work. The production has been compared to the TV Show Girls. BLKS was originally their final thesis project at NYU. 

Actors Nora Carroll (Octavia), Leea Ayers (June), Danielle Davis (Ry) and Celeste M. Cooper (Imani) performed in the Steppenwolf's Theatre Company's rendition of BLKS. The show was directed by Nataki Garrett and artistic director Anna D. Shapiro. The show debuted on December 18, 2017, and ran through January 28, 2018.

Awards 
 2015 Winter Tangerine Award
 2013 NYU Grey Art Gallery Prize for Radical Presence
 Emerging Poets fellowship at Poets House
 Cave Canem Fellow
Antonyo Award for Best Play for BLKS

Personal life 
Barnes is a queer black poet. They are originally from Los Angeles. Barnes was born with a polycystic ovary and as such grows facial hair. They use they/their/them pronouns. 

Barnes currently lives in Los Angeles, California.

References 

21st-century American poets
Year of birth missing (living people)
Poets from California
Writers from Los Angeles
Tisch School of the Arts alumni
University of Mississippi alumni
Slam poets
Living people